The Jean-Noël Nord-Est river is a tributary of the north bank of the Jean-Noël River, flowing in the town of La Malbaie and the municipality of Saint-Irénée, in the Charlevoix-Est Regional County Municipality, in the administrative region of Capitale-Nationale, in the province of Quebec, in Canada.

The southern part of this small valley is accessible by the rang Saint-Pierre road, which runs on the northeast side of the river. The intermediate part is served by chemin du rang Saint-Pierre and chemin Saint-Louis. The upper part is served by route 138, chemin du rang Sainte-Philomène and chemin du rang Saint-Louis. Forestry is the main economic activity in this valley; recreational tourism activities, second; agriculture, third.

The surface of the Jean-Noël Nord-Est river is generally frozen from the beginning of December until the end of March; however, safe traffic on the ice is generally from mid-December to mid-March. The water level of the river varies with the seasons and the precipitation; the spring flood occurs in March or April.

Geography 
The Jean-Noël Nord-Est river takes its source from a small lake located on the northwest side of the Saint-Jean-Baptiste road, in agricultural and forestry areas. This small lake is wedged between the Montagne de Saint-Jean-Baptiste (located on the south side of the lake) and the Montagne à Joseph-à-Johnny (on the west side). This small lake is located at:
  east of the village center of Notre-Dame-des-Monts;
  west of the northwest shore of the St. Lawrence River;
  south-west of downtown Baie-Saint-Paul;
  south-west of the mouth of the Jean-Noël River.

  to the east and forming a large curve to the north and crossing route 138, to a stream (coming from the north);
  towards the south-east, then curving towards the south, up to the brook of Mules (coming from the south-west);
  to the east, forming small streamers, to a stream (coming from the southwest) which constitutes the outlet of Lac Amédée;
  to the east in the forest and agricultural zone by forming small streamers at the start of the segment and by forming a curve towards the south, up to the bridge on Chemin Saint-Pierre;
  to the south-east in an agricultural area in an increasingly deep valley, to its mouth.

The Jean-Noël Nord-Est river flows on the north bank of the Jean-Noël river, northwest of the village of Saint-Irénée. This mouth is located at:
  east of the confluence of the Jean-Noël river with the Saint Lawrence River;
  south of downtown La Malbaie;
  north-east of downtown Baie-Saint-Paul.

Toponymy 
This toponym evokes the first name of one of the pioneers of Saint-Irénée. This toponym is designated in a cardinal way according to the toponymic designation of its master watercourse, the Jean-Noël river.

The toponym "Rivière Jean-Noël" was formalized on December 5, 1968 at the Place Names Bank of the Commission de toponymie du Québec.

Notes and references

Appendices

Related articles 
 Charlevoix-Est Regional County Municipality
 La Malbaie, a city
 Saint-Irénée, a municipality
 Jean-Noël River
 St. Lawrence River
 List of rivers of Quebec

External links 

Rivers of Capitale-Nationale
Charlevoix-Est Regional County Municipality